Brendan James Aspinall (born 22 July 1975) is a South African former professional footballer who played in the Football League for Mansfield Town.

References

1976 births
living people
South African soccer players
Association football defenders
English Football League players
Mansfield Town F.C. players
Huddersfield Town A.F.C. players
Coleraine F.C. players